Enid Tahirović (born July 22, 1972) is a Bosnian former handballer. He was once considered one of the top goalkeepers in the Bundesliga. He last played in Germany for HSV Hamburg, after having spent four seasons at Frisch Auf Göppingen.

References 

1972 births
Living people
Bosnia and Herzegovina male handball players
People from Bijeljina